Barbara Higbie (born 1958) is an American Grammy nominated, Bammy award winning pianist, composer, violinist, singer-songwriter and multi-instrumentalist. She has played on over 100 CDs including songs with Carlos Santana and Bonnie Raitt. The first female instrumentalist signed to Windham Hill records, she also recorded solo or duo projects for Olivia/Second Wave records and Slowbaby Records. Higbie is a folk, jazz, pop, and fusion composer and singer-songwriter, noted for her highly melodic, jazz/folk performances. She has toured nationally and internationally since the early 1980s, and performed with Bonnie Raitt, Terry Riley, Pete Seeger, The Kronos Quartet, Jaron Lanier, Cris Williamson, Holly Near, Teresa Trull and Ferron.

Born in Michigan and raised in Indiana, she spent several years as a teenager in Ghana with her family, while her father, Nathan B. Higbie III helped establish the successful non-profit "Technoserve". Barbara also worked one summer in Honduras, Central America as a medical volunteer with the non-profit, Amigos de Las Americas. Graduating Phi Beta Kappa from Mills College, she attended the Sorbonne in Paris, and was awarded a Thomas J. Watson Fellowship to collect traditional music in West Africa. It was in Paris that she met Darol Anger and began a fruitful musical collaboration. Together they recorded the album Tideline (1982), one of the early successful records of Windham Hill.  

In 1984, she co-lead a group live album recording at the Montreux Jazz Festival, which then became the successful group "Montreux" with Darol Anger, Mike Marshall, Todd Phillips, Andy Narrell and Michael Manring. She recorded a critically acclaimed album titled Unexpected with singer Teresa Trull in 1983, which was included in The Boston Globes Guide to Best Albums of 1983. Higbie and Trull teamed up again on the 1998 release Playtime. Since 1990, Higbie has released a number of solo albums on the Windham Hill and Slowbaby labels. Her first solo album, 1990's Signs of Life (Windham Hill Records) was named one of the top ten albums of 1990 by The Washington Post. She is known as a versatile and soulful musician.

Higbie maintains an active touring schedule, both as a solo artist and as a member of the Windham Hill Winter Solstice ensemble. She has performed on all 7 continents and in all 50 states. As of 2019, Higbie is co-chair of the non-profit Board of the Society for the Preservation of Traditional Music (Freight and Salvage) in Berkeley, California. She has served on the board of the Freight on and off since 2005.

Personal life
She resides in the San Francisco Bay Area with her family.

Partial discographySolo1990 Signs of Life 
1996 I Surrender
2001 Variations on a Happy Ending
2003 Barbara Higbie's Interpretation of Carole King
2005 Best of (1982–2000)
2007 Alive in Berkeley
2014 Scenes from Life
2019 Resonance
2021 MurmurationWith Darol Anger1982 Tideline 
1984 Live at MontreuxWith Teresa Trull1983 Unexpected 
1998 PlaytimeWith Montreux'''
1986 Sign Language1988 Let Them Say''

References

External links
Official website
 
 

1958 births
Living people
Musicians from Indiana
Mills College alumni
University of Paris alumni
Watson Fellows
People from St. Joseph County, Indiana
Windham Hill Records artists
20th-century American pianists
20th-century American women pianists
Montreux (band) members
21st-century American women